General Lord Charles FitzRoy (17 July 1764 – 20 December 1829) was a British Army officer and politician.

Early life
FitzRoy was born on 17 July 1764. He was the third, but second surviving, son of Augustus FitzRoy, 3rd Duke of Grafton and, his first wife, Anne Liddell, a daughter of Henry Liddell, 1st Baron Ravensworth.

After education at Harrow School and Trinity College, Cambridge, he entered the army in 1782 as an ensign.

Career
In 1787, he was appointed a captain in the Scots Guards and an equerry in 1788, to Prince Frederick, Duke of York and Albany, under whom he served in Flanders from 1793 to 1794.

In 1795, FitzRoy was appointed an aide-de-camp to King George III with the rank of colonel and promoted to major-general in 1798. From 1798 to 1799, he served in Ireland then in England until 1809, commanding a battalion of the 60th Regiment of Foot from 1804 to 1805. He was appointed colonel of the 48th (Northamptonshire) Regiment of Foot and lieutenant-general in 1805 and general in 1814.

From 1787 to 1796 and again from 1802 to 1818, FitzRoy was Member of Parliament for Bury St Edmunds (though never actually spoke in the house). He supported Pitt and favoured abolitionism and Catholic Emancipation.

Personal life
On 20 June 1795, FitzRoy married Frances Mundy, the daughter of Edward Miller Mundy, MP. Before her death in 1797, they had one son:

 Sir Charles Augustus FitzRoy (1796–1858), who served as the governor of New South Wales, governor of Prince Edward Island and governor of Antigua; he married Lady Mary Lennox, eldest child of Charles Lennox, 4th Duke of Richmond, in 1820. After her death in 1847, he married Margaret Gordon in 1855.

After his wife's death, he married Lady Frances Stewart on 10 March 1799. Lady Frances was the eldest daughter of Robert Stewart, 1st Marquess of Londonderry and Frances Pratt (the daughter of the Whig politician Charles Pratt, 1st Earl Camden). Before her death in 1810, they had three children:

 George FitzRoy (1800–1882), British Army officer; he married, Louisa Harris, daughter of John Harris, in 1830. After her death, he married Hon. Charlotte Frances Bona Spencer, daughter of Lt.-Col. Hon. George Augustus Spencer (son of Francis Spencer, 1st Baron Churchill), in 1873.
 Frances FitzRoy (–1878), who married George Rice-Trevor, 4th Baron Dynevor.
 Robert FitzRoy (1805–1865), a hydrographer who married Mary Henrietta O'Brien, daughter of Maj.-Gen. Edward James O'Brien, in 1836. After her death he married Maria Isabella, daughter of John Henry Smyth, of Heath Hall, in 1854.

FitzRoy died at his house in Berkeley Square, London in 1829 and was buried at Wicken, Northamptonshire.

Descendants
Through his son Robert, he was a grandfather of five: Emily-Unah FitzRoy, Frances "Fanny" FitzRoy, Katherine FitzRoy, Robert O'Brien FitzRoy, and Laura Maria Elizabeth FitzRoy.

References

1764 births
1829 deaths
British Army generals
Younger sons of dukes
People educated at Harrow School
Alumni of Trinity College, Cambridge
Scots Guards officers
British Army personnel of the French Revolutionary Wars
People of the Irish Rebellion of 1798
Fitzroy, Charles
C
Members of the Parliament of the United Kingdom for English constituencies
UK MPs 1802–1806
UK MPs 1806–1807
UK MPs 1807–1812
UK MPs 1812–1818
Members of the Parliament of Great Britain for English constituencies
British MPs 1784–1790
British MPs 1790–1796
Royal American Regiment officers